Raffaella De Laurentiis (born 28 June 1952) is an Italian film producer. Films that she has produced include Conan the Barbarian, Conan the Destroyer, Dune, Prancer, Dragon: The Bruce Lee Story, all films in the Dragonheart series, The Forbidden Kingdom and Kull the Conqueror.

She is the daughter of film producer Dino De Laurentiis and actress Silvana Mangano.
She is the sister of Veronica De Laurentiis, who is the mother of Food Network chef Giada De Laurentiis. She appeared in eighteen episodes of Giada's show Giada at Home.

In 1989, she entered a long-term relationship with Universal Pictures whereas De Laurentiis would produce their projects for a 2-year production agreement.

References

External links

1954 births
Living people
Italian film producers
People of Campanian descent
Raffaella